S Club Allstars (previously known as S Club 3) are an English spin-off pop group based in London with S Club 7 and S Club 8 former members. Originally, the group was founded by Bradley McIntosh, Jo O'Meara and Paul Cattermole. In February 2014, Tina Barrett joined them and the group, but in May 2015, Cattermole left the group after the S Club 7 reunion. In August 2020, O'Meara left the group and was replaced by Stacey Franks in December 2021.

History
In 2008, Bradley McIntosh, Jo O'Meara and Paul Cattermole wanted to reform S Club 7, but the other four members were focused on their solo careers. The three artists embarked on tour with the name "S Club 3", performing at nightclubs and festivals. The first performances took place on 17 October 2008 at Tokyo Club, in Bradford. On 12 November 2008, a bottle was thrown at O'Meara during their performance in Bradford. It left her with a severe cut to the head, requiring treatment at a nearby hospital. A 20-year old man was arrested and he said that did justice for her performance on Celebrity Big Brother where nearly 50,000 complaints were received about her and two other female contestants' alleged racist bullying towards Bollywood actress Shilpa Shetty.

On 12 November 2009, S Club 3 turned on the Mansfield Christmas Lights. Between 2009 and 2011 the group continued to tour several British cities. In 2012 the group toured Australia with Big Brovaz on The Ain't No Party Tour. On 31 May they performed on television for the first time as S Club 3 in the Australian daytime show The Morning Show. In February 2014, Tina Barrett joined the group and toured as a four piece. On 22 October, it was confirmed that all seven members of S Club 7 would reunite for the BBC Children in Need and a tour in May 2015. After the S Club 7 full reunion tour, Cattermole decided to leave the spin-off group and O'Meara, McIntosh and Barrett continued to perform together as S Club 3.

On 1 December 2017, the group announced on This Morning that the trio would release its first single, "Family", on 11 December. On 18 August 2019, during a performance in Falmouth, Cornwall, Spearritt joined S Club 3 for a special one-off performance. On 6 August 2020, O'Meara announced online that she had left the group to focus on her second solo album. British singer Amelia Lily was considered to replace her, but McIntosh and Barrett decided to stay as a duo and renamed the project as S Club Live. In December 2021, Stacey Franks joined the group, having previously been a member of S Club 8 (originally S Club Juniors) and they were renamed "S Club Allstars".

Members
Timeline

Discography

Singles

Concert tours
Headlining
 S Club Live (2008–2022)
 The Ain't No Party: Australian Tour (2012)
 S Club Party Tour (2014)

Co-headlining
 90's Australia Tour with B*Witched, Atomic Kitten and East 17 (2017)
 Step Back 90's with B*Witched, Five, 911 and East 17 (2018)
 Poptastic Tour with Five, Big Brovaz and G.R.L. (2019)

References

S Club 7

English dance music groups
English pop music groups
Musical groups established in 2008
Musical groups from London